This Is M.E. is the thirteenth studio album by American rock/pop musician Melissa Etheridge, released on September 30, 2014 by Etheridge's own label ME Records, which is distributed by Primary Wave Records. It features eleven tracks on the standard release and four bonus tracks on the Target exclusive version.

Reception

Chart history
In its first week on the Billboard 200, This Is M.E. debuted at No. 21. It also debuted at No. 23 on the Digital Albums chart, and No. 5 on the Top Rock Albums chart, selling 14,000 copies in the first week. The album has sold 50,000 copies in the United States as of September 2016.

Critical reception
Allmusic said of the album, "There's something appealing in hearing Etheridge try a number of new sounds: not everything fits but the restlessness is admirable", and awarded the album three stars. Rolling Stone also awarded the album three stars, and wrote "As always, her voice can walk a fine line between passionate and histrionic, but when she dials it back on the smoldering 'Like A Preacher', it's clear that this honeymoon might be the start of a whole new her."

Promotion

Album cover
On June 18, 2014, Etheridge posted a video to her YouTube page calling for fans to submit photos of themselves for her new album cover. Etheridge said of this "Because my fans are such a huge part of ME, and I wouldn't be ME without YOU, I took photos submitted by my fans and turned it into my album cover". The finished album cover is a mosaic of numerous small photos of fans, with colors slightly tinted to form the appearance of Etheridge.

Press tour and YouTube duet
Etheridge embarked on an extensive promotional tour in support of the album, appearing on such shows as The Meredith Vieira Show, Entertainment Tonight, The View, Good Morning America, and Live with Kelly and Michael. On October 3, 2014, singer/songwriter Sam Tsui released a video on YouTube of his cover of "A Little Hard Hearted," in which featured Etheridge as well.

Track listing
All songs written or co-written by Melissa Etheridge.

Personnel
Performance Credits
Melissa Etheridge – guitar, harmonica, piano, vocals
Bernard Grobman – guitar, steel guitar
Jon Levine – Hammond organ, bass guitar, piano, glockenspiel, keyboards
Randy Cooke – drums
Angela Hunt – vocals
Angela Hunte – vocals
Natalie Walker – vocals
Jonathan Li – voices
Farrah "Fendi" Fleurimond – vocals
MBF – voices
Jerrod Bettis – bass guitar
M B F – voices
Jon Levin – Hammond organ, piano, keyboards
Melissa Papp – voices
Amritha Vaz – strings
Neyla Pekarek – cello, vocals
Jon Sosin – banjo, ukulele
Bruce Crews – voices
Jamale Hopkins – percussion, drums
Roccstar – guitar
Brie Biblow – voices
Natalie Loren Walker – vocals
Robert L. Morris – drums, percussion

Technical Credits
Melissa Etheridge – Composer, Executive Producer
Stephen Marcussen – Mastering
Jon Levine – Composer, Producer
Jerry "Wonda" Duplessis – Composer, Producer
Josh Grabelle – Artwork
J.J. Blair – Engineer
Arden Altino – Composer
Angela Hunte – Composer
Sergio "Sergical" Tsai – Engineer
Adam Kapit – Composer, Producer
Nick Radovanovic – Associate Remixing Engineer
Arden "Keyz" Altino – Producer
Daniel Piscina – Engineer
Christian Seibert – Composer
Josh Gwilliam – Engineer
Andrew Robertson – Engineer
Jerrod Bettis – Composer, Producer
Lance Powell – Engineer
Todd Hurtt – Engineer
Roccstar – Composer, Producer
Ralph Rhim – Engineer
Noah Diamond – Composer
Kelsey Eckstein – Composer
Ralph Phim – Engineer
Marcel Pariseau – Public Relations

Charts

References

2014 albums
Melissa Etheridge albums
Albums produced by Jon Levine
Albums produced by RoccStar
Albums produced by Jerry Wonda